The Spanish Agency of Medicines and Medical Devices (AEMPS) is a regulatory and autonomous agency of the Government of Spain that acts as the highest sanitary authority in the country in terms of medical safety on medicines, health products, cosmetics and personal care products.

The agency is responsible for the regulation and authorization of clinical trials and the commercialization of sanitary products for human use, the planification and evaluation of those products along with the European Medicines Agency (EMA); the authorization of clinical laboratories, develop the specific rules to ensure the quality of the medical products and inspect all sanitary products of the central government competence. Since 1998, the agency has powers over the control, evaluation and authorization of animal health products.

The agency was created under the name of Agencia Española del Medicamento by the Fiscal, Administrative and Social Order Measures Act of 1997 and its powers were extended (to fields such as veterinary drugs) by another law of the same name from 1998 and by the Cohesion and Quality of the National Health System Act of 2003. The statute of the agency was approved in 1999. It was renamed as Agencia Española de Medicamentos y Productos Sanitarios in August 2003. It depends directly from the Ministry of Health.

The agency is chaired by a President and a Vice President. Both officials are Under Secretaries of the Ministry of Health and Agriculture. The real chief executive of the agency is the Director.

Organization chart
The agency is divided in six type of bodies: Governing bodies, executive bodies, control committees, administrative bodies, supporting bodies and complementary bodies.

 Governing bodies:
 President. It's the Secretary-General for Health, with the rank of Under Secretary.
 Vice President. It's the Secretary-General for Agriculture and Food, with the rank of Under Secretary.
 Governing Board.
 Control Committee.
 Executive Body.
 Director.
 Support body to the executive body.
 Administrative bodies.
 General Secretariat.
 Department for Drug Inspection and Control
 Department for Medicinal Products for Human Use
 Department for Health Products
 Department for Veterinary Drugs
 Complementary bodies. It is a series of organs made up of experts in specific subjects.
 Medicinal Products for Human Use Committee
 Safety of Medicinal Products for Human Use Committee
 Veterinary Medicines Committee
 Veterinary Medicines Safety Committee
 Technical Committee of the Spanish Pharmacovigilance System for Medicinal Products for Human Use
 Post-authorization Studies Coordination Committee
 Technical Committee of the Spanish Pharmacovigilance System for Veterinary Drugs
 Veterinary Medicines Availability Committee
 Pharmacopoeia Committee and the National Formulary
 Technical Inspection Committee
 Coordination Committee of Peripheral Pharmaceutical Services
 Health Products Committee
 Expert Network Committee.

See also
 Health care in Spain
 Spanish National Health System
 Pharmacoepidemiology

References
Citations

Bibliography
 
 

Government agencies of Spain
Government agencies established in 1997
National agencies for drug regulation
1997 establishments in Spain